Morales Peak is a peak which rises from the southern part of Metavolcanic Mountain in Antarctica, just east of Reedy Glacier. It was mapped by the United States Geological Survey from surveys and U.S. Navy air photos, 1960–64, and was named by the Advisory Committee on Antarctic Names for Tommy S. Morales, a radio operator at Byrd Station in 1962.

References

External links

Mountains of Marie Byrd Land